Pietro Platania (5 April 1828 – 26 April 1907) was an Italian composer and music educator.

Platania was born at Catania and was a student of Pietro Raimondi. Beginning in 1882, he was the maestro di cappella of Milan Cathedral, and from 1885 to 1902, he served as the director of the Naples Conservatory. As a composer, he was known for his orchestral and church music. He was considered by Gioacchino Rossini and Giuseppe Verdi, among others, to be the greatest master of counterpoint of his day; the latter invited him to contribute to the Messa per Rossini, for which he wrote the Sanctus. He died in Naples.

References

External links
 

1828 births
1907 deaths
Classical composers of church music
Italian classical composers
Italian male classical composers
Italian conductors (music)
Italian male conductors (music)
Italian music educators
Musicians from Catania
19th-century Italian musicians
19th-century Italian male musicians